Khammam Fort is a fort in the city of Khammam, Telangana, India constructed by [[Lakshma Reddy, Ranga Reddy and Velama Reddy]. It served as an impregnable citadel during various regimes of different dynasties, including the Musunuri Nayaks, Qutb Shahi’s and Asaf Jahis. The fort was situated in a very vast area in the heart of the City of Khammam. It was notified as a protected monument by the Archaeology Department several decades ago. Despite decades of neglect, the historical edifice, which once flourished with regal opulence, presents its alluring charm due to its architectural splendor.

Etymology
The historical records show that the earlier name was "Kambham mettu" or "Stambhadri". "Mettu" means hill or highland in the Telugu language. The name was also anglicised as "Commomet" and "Khammammet".

Construction 
The Khammam Fort was built by Musunuri Nayaks. Several inscriptions were discovered in the surrounding areas of Khammam and Krishna districts of Musunuri Nayaks. Khammam slowly became an independent territory within the kingdom of Kakatiyas for Musunuri Nayaks. 75 Telugu speaking feudatories of the region under the leadership of Musunuri Nayaks fought for 10 long years to unify the Telugu land and succeeded in repulsing the Delhi Sultanate forces under Malik Maqbul (Khan-e-Jahan Tilangani) out of their country.

Architecture & Significant Features
 This Fort is located in an area of 4 Sq. miles in the heart of the City of Khammam on top of a massive granite Hill. It is surrounded by a huge rock wall averaging between 40 and 80 feet(13 to 25 Meters) in height and 15 to 20 feet(4.5 to 6 Meters) in width. There are steps from each buruju (bastion) to enter into the fort. The Fort was considered practically impregnable by invading armies.
 A number of balconies and windows are constructed along the wall in order to use the artillery during wartime. It has a capacity of mounting at least 60 cannons at a time.
 The fort 10 large gates most of them in poor shape now. Each gate has cannons mounted on them along with a water pot made of rocks. They are built such that an impact of a cannonball could not break it.
 The main entrance is a 30-foot tall entrance known as the Khilla darwaza (meaning fort gate in Urdu). It has 2 cannons on either side of the entrance. One of them still mounted with a head. They are now partially destroyed due to the negligence of the archeology department.
 The east gate or the secondary entrance is equally large and is popularly known as the Raathi Darwaza (meaning stone entrance in Urdu) or Potha Darwaza.
 All other gates are smaller than the main entrance and could have been constructed to avoid large cavalries to enter the fort in case of an attack.
 A huge rainwater catchment system and well have been constructed on the Khilla during the period of Zafar-ud-doula, well known for construction of tanks during Qutb shahi dynasty. This massive tank is now known as the 'Zafar well'. It is 60 feet X 30 feet stepped well with a bridge across it for men and horses to move around. He also built the walls using Bricks and limestone along the fort.
 As soon as we enter the Khilla darwaza, one can see the Fort at a distance of 300 feet. There are small steps carved out of this hill to reach the top of the Hill fort. They are later renovated with railings for the steps by the Tourism department and Archaeological Survey of India in 2005 during the 1000 year celebrations of this historical fort. A lot of small gates known as 'Dalohiswar' are all around the walls of the fort.
 Fort has at least 15 bastions constructed with two massive walls as a military strategy to take the impact of the cannonballs and to counter the enemy from the top. A 15-foot deep trench is dug in some places for the army to store and use as a hiding place.
 The huge blocks of stone used for the walls are as long as 10 feet and are believed to be transported using elephants and men. No mud or limestone is used in this huge wall and the rocks are tightly placed and leaving the viewers amazed by the construction
 A permanent Gallows has been erected on this prominent hill fort, where the estimated seat of justice could have been inside the fort. The platform is made of Stone and appears like a well, due to which the locals call this 'Nethi bhavi' ('నేతి బావి 'meaning Ghee well). This stone structure could be seen from allover the city of khammam.
 The fort is believed to have a secret tunnels to the Warangal Fort with multiple entrances in different locations at the fort. One such entrance is 10 feet in diameter and the steps to enter the tunnel are closed due to damage over the years. The local folklore includes stories about valuables being transferred between the kings from here using the secret passages and escaping enemy attacks through them.

Culture 
This fort appears to be a replicate the cultures of both Hindu and Muslim rulers who ruled this fort city.

The Lakshmi Narasimha swami temple in Brahmin bazar, Sri Ramalingeshwara temple is one of the oldest shivalayam (Shiva temple) are some of the oldest Hindu temples in Telangana and are older than the fort itself.

During the Qutb shahi dynasty, many new places of worship have been constructed in and around the fort such as the Khilla masjid.

Encroachments 
The fort, once mighty bastion of royal dynasties, continues to face further encroachment threat due to lack of proper monitoring mechanism. Large settlements occupied the areas in and around the fort due to the lack of proper monitoring of encroachments. Destruction of the granite hill and construction of houses continues till today around the fort area.

Development 
Recently Minister for Roads & Buildings Tummala Nageswara Rao has mooted the proposal to set up solar streetlights at the fort well before the next Independence Day celebrations in 2017.

See also 
Musunuri Nayaks

References

http://www.namasthetelangaana.com/TelanganaNews-in-Telugu/khammam-fort-khammam-telangana-tourism-1-15-354124.html

http://www.thehindu.com/news/national/telangana/khammam-fort-heritage-in-peril/article6835132.ece

http://www.thehindu.com/news/national/telangana/historic-khammam-fort-set-to-get-back-its-sheen/article6837735.ece

Forts in Telangana
Khammam
Tourist attractions in Khammam district